Dean Cirque is a cirque between the southeast part of Prentice Plateau and Apollo Peak in the Olympus Range, McMurdo Dry Valleys. The cirque opens south to the Labyrinth. It was named by the Advisory Committee on Antarctic Names (2004) after Christopher T. Dean, PHI helicopter pilot with the United States Antarctic Program in eight consecutive field seasons from 1996–97.

References
 

Cirques of Antarctica
Landforms of Victoria Land
McMurdo Dry Valleys